The Sportingbet.com World Series of Snooker was a series of invitational snooker tournaments set up as a complement to the WPBSA's tour Its first season was played in 2008/2009, consisting of four two-day tournaments in St. Helier, Berlin, Moscow and Warsaw and the three-day Grand Final in Portimão.

It featured ten leading players – each tournament featured four of these taking on four wild cards. Points were awarded for reaching at least the semi-finals. The winner of each tournament received five points, the runner-up three and losing semi-finalists one each. These points determined seeding positions for the Grand Final.

There was a previous incarnation of the event organised by Matchroom Sport, that ran in the 1987/88 season, and from 1990/91 until 1992/93.

Management and purpose
The tour was set up by FSTC Sports Management, who managed leading snooker players John Higgins and Graeme Dott, as well as Eurosport (who screened the events alongside the coverage of the WPBSA tour), Higgins, and leading referee Michaela Tabb. Higgins felt that the game's attendances were too low, and that potential new venues outside the game's traditional United Kingdom and recently developed Far East markets were not being utilised, and wanted to give something back to the sport. After conducting exploratory tours a trial event was staged in 2007 in Warsaw. The event was called the 2007 Warsaw Snooker Tour. This paved the way and the World Series started in the 2008/2009 season.. The World Series lasted for two seasons.

Results

1987/1988

1990/1991

1991/1992

1992/1993

2007/2008

2008/2009

2009/2010

References

 
Recurring sporting events established in 1987
Recurring events disestablished in 2010
1987 establishments in Hong Kong
2010 disestablishments in the Czech Republic
Defunct snooker competitions
Snooker non-ranking competitions
Snooker pro–am competitions
Snooker in Europe
Snooker tours and series